Bahamas Cricket Association is the official governing body of the sport of cricket in The Bahamas. Bahamas Cricket Association is The Bahamas's representative at the International Cricket Council and is an associate member and has been a member of that body since 1986. It is included in the ICC Americas region.

History

References

External links
Cricinfo-Bahamas

Cricket administration